Albert Florian may refer to:

 Lord Charles Albert Florian Wellesley, 1833 pseudonym of Charlotte Brontë, English writer
 Albert Flórián, Hungarian footballer